The statue of Max Planck by Bernhard Heiliger at Humboldt University of Berlin in Berlin-Mitte, Germany.

References

External links
 

Statues in Berlin
Outdoor sculptures in Berlin
Sculptures of men in Germany
Statues in Germany